Bhojipura Junction railway station is a railway station in Bareilly district, Uttar Pradesh. Its code is BPR. It serves Bhojipura assembly constituency. The station consists of 3 platforms.

Trains

References

Izzatnagar railway division
Railway stations in Bareilly district